"Kajenglei" or "Leitreng" is a Manipuri headdress, consisting of eighty to hundred brass strips, worn especially by goddesses, female royalties, dancers and brides. It is believed to be developed during the reign of King Gambhir Singh in the kingdom of Manipur. It is made from the plant Khekwai which grows abundantly in Hilly areas of Manipur. The product is presently available in most of the markets including Khwairamband Bazar in Manipur.

References

Meitei culture